Chrysophyllum colombianum is a tree in the family Sapotaceae, native to Central and South America.

Description
Its red to brown bark is scaly. Fascicles feature up to 15 greenish flowers.

Distribution and habitat
Chrysophyllum colombianum is native to an area from Costa Rica in the north to Brazil and Peru in the south.

References

colombianum
Flora of Central America
Flora of western South America
Flora of North Brazil
Plants described in 1967
Taxa named by André Aubréville